Durval de Moraes (born 20 March 1960) is a Brazilian weightlifter. He competed in the men's flyweight event at the 1980 Summer Olympics.

References

1960 births
Living people
Brazilian male weightlifters
Olympic weightlifters of Brazil
Weightlifters at the 1980 Summer Olympics
Place of birth missing (living people)